Adam Seth Gardner (born May 31, 1973) is an American guitarist and vocalist of the band Guster and a member of the Tufts University Beelzebubs.

Gardner grew up outside Morristown, New Jersey, and played for a band called Royal Flush while a student at the Pingry School, from which he graduated in 1991. He also attended Harding Township School in New Vernon, New Jersey. Gardner, working with Dave Schneider, created a side-project in 2005 called The LeeVees. Its album, Hanukkah Rocks, consists of humorous original songs about the Jewish holiday. After living in Brooklyn near the other members of Guster for a time, Gardner relocated to Maine.

Gardner broadcasts a weekly radio show in Portland, Maine where he discusses everything from music to environmental issues.

Environmental activism

Adam and his wife Lauren started Reverb, an eco-friendly companion to summer rock tours. Gardner was interviewed about Reverb for the July 2006 issue of The Green Room.

References

Living people
American rock guitarists
American male guitarists
Jewish American musicians
Tufts University alumni
Pingry School alumni
People from Morristown, New Jersey
Guitarists from New Jersey
1973 births
Jewish rock musicians
Guster members
20th-century American guitarists
21st-century American guitarists
20th-century American male musicians
21st-century American male musicians
21st-century American Jews